Hell and Back or Hell and Back Again or To Hell and Back may refer to: هی گایز سبک اینو میدونید بگید

Books
To Hell and Back (book), a 1949 autobiography of soldier and actor Audie Murphy
Meat Loaf: To Hell and Back, a 2004 autobiography of Meat Loaf, or its film adaptation
Hell and Back (comics), a 1999–2000 comic book series

Film and TV
To Hell and Back (film), a 1955 film adaptation of Audie Murphy's autobiography
 To Hell and Back (1968 film), a 1968 film directed by Giovanni Fago
"To Hell and Back", a 1996 episode of American Gothic
Hell and Back Again, a 2011 documentary film by Danfung Dennis
Hell and Back (film), a 2015 animated comedy film
"To Hull and Back", a 1985 Christmas special episode of the BBC sitcom Only Fools and Horses

Music
Hell and Back (album), a 2004 album by Drag On
To Hell and Back (album), a 2000 album by Sinergy
Hell and Back Together: 1984–1990, a 1992 compilation album by T.S.O.L.
"To Hell & Back", a 2009 song by Blessthefall from their album Witness
"To Hell and Back", a 2014 song by Sabaton from their album Heroes
"Hell and Back", a song by Metallica from their 2011 EP Beyond Magnetic
"To Hell & Back, a 2020 song by Maren Morris for her album Girl

Video gaming
To Hell and Back (video game), a platform game developed for the Commodore 64

See also
 Katabasis, the mythological concept of literally journeying into and returning from the underworld.